1 Dubai was a complex of three skyscrapers proposed for Jumeirah Garden City in Dubai, United Arab Emirates. Tower 1 would have been the tallest and Towers 2 and 3 much shorter. The complex was designed by Adrian Smith + Gordon Gill Architecture, and the developer was Meraas.

The structure of the building would have been connected by a series of glass skybridges and at the base of the skyscraper there would have been grand arched entrances, that would have allowed boats to travel underneath the building and into a central atrium space. However, in 2009, the project was cancelled.

See also 
 1 Park Avenue
 EP 09 Towers
 Meraas Tower
 Jumeirah Garden City

References

External links 
 1 Dubai (Complex) Emporis.com

Unbuilt buildings and structures in Dubai